A location-based service (LBS) is a general term denoting software services which use geographic data and information to provide services or information to users. LBS can be used in a variety of contexts, such as health, indoor object search, entertainment, work, personal life, etc. Commonly used examples of location based services include navigation software, social networking services, location-based advertising, and tracking systems. LBS can also include mobile commerce when taking the form of coupons or advertising directed at customers based on their current location. LBS also includes personalized weather services and even location-based games.

LBS is critical to many businesses as well as government organizations to drive real insight from data tied to a specific location where activities take place. The spatial patterns that location-related data and services can provide is one of its most powerful and useful aspects where location is a common denominator in all of these activities and can be leveraged to better understand patterns and relationships. Banking, surveillance, online commerce, and many weapon systems are dependent on LBS.

Access policies are controlled by location data and/or time-of-day constraints, or a combination thereof. As such, an LBS is an information service and has a number of uses in social networking today as information, in entertainment or security, which is accessible with mobile devices through the mobile network and which uses information on the geographical position of the mobile device.

This concept of location based systems is not compliant with the standardized concept of real-time locating systems (RTLS) and related local services, as noted in ISO/IEC 19762-5 and ISO/IEC 24730-1.  While networked computing devices generally do very well to inform consumers of days old data, the computing devices themselves can also be tracked, even in real-time. LBS privacy issues arise in that context, and are documented below.

History
Location-based services (LBS) are widely used in many 21st Century computer systems and applications. Modern location based services are made possible by technological developments such as the World Wide Web, Global Positioning Systems, and the widespread use of mobile phones.

Location based services were developed by integrating data from satellite navigation systems, cellular networks, and mobile computing, to provide services based on the geographical locations of users. Over their history, location based software has evolved from simple synchronization based service models to authenticated and complex tools for implementing virtually any location based service model or facility.

There is currently no agreed upon criteria for defining the market size of location based services, but the European GNSS Agency estimated that 40% of all computer applications used location based software as of 2013, and 30% of all internet searches were for locations.

LBS is the ability to open and close specific data objects based on the use of location and/or time as (controls and triggers) or as part of complex cryptographic key or hashing systems and the data they provide access to. Location based services may be one of the most heavily used application-layer decision framework in computing.

The Global Positioning System was first developed by the United States Department of Defense in the 1970s, and was made available for worldwide use and use by civilians in the 1980s. Research forerunners of today's location-based services include the infrared Active Badge system (1989–1993), the Ericsson-Europolitan GSM LBS trial by Jörgen Johansson (1995), and the master thesis written by Nokia employee Timo Rantalainen in 1995.

In 1990 International Teletrac Systems (later PacTel Teletrac), founded in Los Angeles CA, introduced the world's first dynamic real-time stolen vehicle recovery services. As an adjacency to this they began developing location based services that could transmit information about location-based goods and services to custom-programmed alphanumeric Motorola pagers.  In 1996 the US Federal Communications Commission (FCC) issued rules requiring all US mobile operators to locate emergency callers. This rule was a compromise resulting from US mobile operators seeking the support of the emergency community in order to obtain the same protection from lawsuits relating to emergency calls as fixed-line operators already had.

In 1997 Christopher Kingdon, of Ericsson, handed in the Location Services (LCS) stage 1 description to the joint GSM group of the European Telecommunications Standards Institute (ETSI) and the American National Standards Institute (ANSI). As a result, the LCS sub-working group was created under ANSI T1P1.5. This group went on to select positioning methods and standardize Location Services (LCS), later known as Location Based Services (LBS). Nodes defined include the Gateway Mobile Location Centre (GMLC), the Serving Mobile Location Centre (SMLC) and concepts such as Mobile Originating Location Request (MO-LR), Network Induced Location Request (NI-LR) and Mobile Terminating Location Request (MT-LR).

As a result of these efforts in 1999 the first Digital Location Based Service Patent was filed in the US and ultimately issued after nine office actions in March 2002. The patent has controls which when applied to today's networking models provide key value in all systems.

In 2000, after approval from the worlds 12 largest telecom operators, Ericsson, Motorola and Nokia jointly formed and launched the Location Interoperability Forum Ltd (LIF). This forum first specified the Mobile Location Protocol (MLP), an interface between the telecom network and an LBS application running on a server in the Internet Domain. Then, much driven by the Vodafone group, LIF went on to specify the Location Enabling Server (LES), a "middleware", which simplifies the integration of multiple LBS with an operators infrastructure. In 2004 LIF was merged with the Open Mobile Association (OMA). An LBS work group was formed within the OMA.

In 2002, Marex.com in Miami Florida designed the world first marine asset telemetry device for commercial sale. The device, designed by Marex and engineered by its partner firms in telecom and hardware, was capable of transmitting location data and retrieving location based service data via both cellular and satellite based communications channels. Utilizing the Orbcomm satellite network, the device had multi level SOS features for both MAYDAY and marine assistance, vessel system condition and performance monitoring with remote notification, plus a dedicated hardware device similar to modern GPS units. Based upon the device location, it was capable of providing detailed bearing, distance and communication information to the vessel operator in real time, in addition to the marine assistance/MAYDAY features. The concept and functionality was coined Location Based Services by the principal architect and product manager for Marex, Jason Manowitz, SVP, Product and Strategy, Marex.com, the device was branded as IMAMS or Integrated Marine Asset Management System and the proof of concept beta device was demonstrated to various US government agencies for vessel identification, tracking, and enforcement operations in addition to the commercial product line. The device was capable of tracking assets including ships, planes, shipping containers, or any other mobile asset with a proper power source and antenna placement. Marex's financial challenges were unable to support product introduction and the beta device disappeared.

The first consumer LBS-capable mobile web device was the Palm VII, released in 1999. Two of the in-the-box applications made use of the ZIP code-level positioning information and share the title for first consumer LBS application: the Weather.com app from The Weather Channel, and the TrafficTouch app from Sony-Etak / Metro Traffic.

The first LBS services were launched during 2001 by TeliaSonera in Sweden (FriendFinder, yellow pages, houseposition, emergency call location etc.) and by EMT in Estonia (emergency call location, friend finder, TV game). TeliaSonera and EMT based their services on the Ericsson Mobile Positioning System (MPS).

Other early LBS include friendzone, launched by swisscom in Switzerland in May 2001, using the technology of valis ltd. The service included friend finder, LBS dating and LBS games. The same service was launched later by Vodafone Germany, Orange Portugal and Pelephone in Israel. Microsoft's Wi-Fi-based indoor location system RADAR (2000), MIT's Cricket project using ultrasound location (2000) and Intel's Place Lab with wide-area location (2003).

In May 2002, go2 and AT&T Mobility launched the first (US) mobile LBS local search application that used Automatic Location Identification (ALI) technologies mandated by the FCC. go2 users were able to use AT&T's ALI to determine their location and search near that location to obtain a list of requested locations (stores, restaurants, etc.) ranked by proximity to the ALI provide by the AT&T wireless network. The ALI determined location was also used as a starting point for turn-by-turn directions.

The main advantage is that mobile users do not have to manually specify ZIP codes or other location identifiers to use LBS, when they roam into a different location. GPS tracking is a major enabling ingredient, utilizing access to mobile web.

Location industry
There are various companies that sell access to an individual's location history and this is estimated to be a $12 billion industry composed of collectors, aggregators and marketplaces. As of 2021, a company named Near claimed to have data from 1.6 billion people in 44 different countries, Mobilewalla claims data on 1.9 billion devices, and X-Mode claims to have a database of 25 percent of the U.S. adult population. An analysis, conducted by the non-profit newsroom called The Markup, found six out of 47 companies who claimed over a billion devices in their database. As of 2021, there are no rules or laws governing who can buy an individual's data.

Locating methods
There are a number of ways in which the location of an object, such as a mobile phone or device, can be determined. Another emerging method for confirming location is IoT and blockchain-based relative object location verification.

Control plane locating
With control plane locating, sometimes referred to as positioning, the mobile phone service provider gets the location based on the radio signal delay of the closest cell-phone towers (for phones without GPS features) which can be quite slow as it uses the 'voice control' channel. In the UK, networks do not use trilateration; Because LBS services use a single base station, with a "radius" of inaccuracy, to determine a phone's location. This technique was the basis of the E-911 mandate and is still used to locate cellphones as a safety measure. Newer phones and PDAs typically have an integrated A-GPS chip.

In addition there are emerging techniques like Real Time Kinematics and WiFi RTT (Round Trip Timing) as part of Precision Time Management services in WiFi and related protocols.

In order to provide a successful LBS technology the following factors must be met:
 coordinates accuracy requirements that are determined by the relevant service,
 lowest possible cost,
 minimal impact on network and equipment.

Several categories of methods can be used to find the location of the subscriber. The simple and standard solution is LBS based on GPS or an alternative satellite navigation system. Sony Ericsson's "NearMe" is one such example. It is used to maintain knowledge of the exact location, however can be expensive for the end-user, as they would have to invest in a GPS-equipped handset. GPS is based on the concept of trilateration, a basic geometric principle that allows finding one location if one knows its distance from other, already known locations.

Self-reported positioning 

A low cost alternative to using location technology to track the player, is to not track at all. This has been referred to as "self-reported positioning". It was used in the mixed reality game called Uncle Roy All Around You in 2003 and considered for use in the Augmented reality games in 2006. Instead of tracking technologies, players were given a map which they could pan around and subsequently mark their location upon. With the rise of location-based networking, this is more commonly known as a user "check-in".

Other

Near LBS (NLBS) involves local-range technologies such as Bluetooth low energy, WLAN, infrared and/or RFID/Near field communication technologies, which are used to match devices to nearby services. This application allows a person to access information based on their surroundings; especially suitable for using inside closed premises, restricted or regional area.
Another alternative is an operator- and GPS-independent location service based on access into the deep level telecoms network (SS7). This solution enables accurate and quick determination of geographical coordinates of mobile phone numbers by providing operator-independent location data and works also for handsets that are not GPS-enabled.

Many other local positioning systems and indoor positioning systems are available, especially for indoor use. GPS and GSM do not work very well indoors, so other techniques are used, including co-pilot beacon for CDMA networks, Bluetooth, UWB, RFID and Wi-Fi.

Applications
Location-based services may be employed in a number of applications, including:
 recommending social events in a city
 requesting the nearest business or service, such as an ATM, restaurant or a retail store
 turn-by-turn navigation to any address
 assistive healthcare systems
 locating people on a map displayed on the mobile phone
 receiving alerts, such as notification of a sale on gas or warning of a traffic jam
 location-based mobile advertising
 asset recovery combined with active RF to find, for example, stolen assets in containers where GPS would not work
 contextualizing learning and research
 games where your location is part of the game play, for example your movements during your day make your avatar move in the game or your position unlocks content.
 real-time Q&A revolving around restaurants, services, and other venues.
 tracking a NASA lunar lander.
 sending a mobile caller's location during an emergency call using Advanced Mobile Location

For the carrier, location-based services provide added value by enabling services such as:
 Resource tracking with dynamic distribution. Taxis, service people, rental equipment, doctors, fleet scheduling.
 Resource tracking. Objects without privacy controls, using passive sensors or RF tags, such as packages and train boxcars.
 Finding someone or something. Person by skill (doctor), business directory, navigation, weather, traffic, room schedules, stolen phone, emergency calls.
 Proximity-based notification (push or pull). Targeted advertising, buddy list, common profile matching (dating).
 Proximity-based actuation (push or pull). Payment based upon proximity (EZ pass, toll watch), automatic airport check-in.

In the U.S. the FCC requires that all carriers meet certain criteria for supporting location-based services (FCC 94–102). The mandate requires 95% of handsets to resolve within 300 meters for network-based tracking (e.g. triangulation) and 150 meters for handset-based tracking (e.g. GPS). This can be especially useful when dialing an emergency telephone number – such as enhanced 9-1-1 in North America, or 112 in Europe – so that the operator can dispatch emergency services such as emergency medical services, police or firefighters to the correct location. CDMA and iDEN operators have chosen to use GPS location technology for locating emergency callers. This led to rapidly increasing penetration of GPS in iDEN and CDMA handsets in North America and other parts of the world where CDMA is widely deployed. Even though no such rules are yet in place in Japan or in Europe the number of GPS-enabled GSM/WCDMA handset models is growing fast. According to the independent wireless analyst firm Berg Insight the attach rate for GPS is growing rapidly in GSM/WCDMA handsets, from less than 8% in 2008 to 15% in 2009.

As for economic impact, location based services are estimated to have a $1.6 Trillion impact on the US economy alone.

European operators are mainly using Cell ID for locating subscribers. This is also a method used in Europe by companies that are using cell based LBS as part of systems to recover stolen assets. In the US companies such as Rave Wireless in New York are using GPS and triangulation to enable college students to notify campus police when they are in trouble.

Comparison of location tracking apps for mobile devices
Currently there are roughly three different models for location-based apps on mobile devices.  All share that they allow one's location to be tracked by others. Each functions in the same way at a high level, but with differing functions and features.  Below is a comparison of an example application from each of the three models.

Mobile messaging
Mobile messaging plays an essential role in LBS. Messaging, especially SMS, has been used in combination with various LBS applications, such as location-based mobile advertising.
SMS is still the main technology carrying mobile advertising / marketing campaigns to mobile phones. A classic example of LBS applications using SMS is the delivery of mobile coupons or discounts to mobile subscribers who are near to advertising restaurants, cafes, movie theatres. The Singaporean mobile operator MobileOne carried out such an initiative in 2007 that involved many local marketers, what was reported to be a huge success in terms of subscriber acceptance.

Privacy issues

The Location Privacy Protection Act of 2012 (S.1223) was introduced by Senator Al Franken (D-MN) in order to regulate the transmission and sharing of user location data in the United States. It is based on the individual's one time consent to participate in these services (Opt In). The bill specifies the collecting entities, the collectable data and its usage. The bill does not specify, however, the period of time that the data collecting entity can hold on to the user data (a limit of 24 hours seems appropriate since most of the services use the data for immediate searches, communications, etc.), and the bill does not include location data stored locally on the device (the user should be able to delete the contents of the location data document periodically just as he would delete a log document). The bill which was approved by the Senate Judiciary Committee, would also require mobile services to disclose the names of the advertising networks or other third parties with which they share consumers' locations.

With the passing of the CAN-SPAM Act in 2003, it became illegal in the United States to send any message to the end user without the end user specifically opting-in. This put an additional challenge on LBS applications as far as "carrier-centric" services were concerned. As a result, there has been a focus on user-centric location-based services and applications which give the user control of the experience, typically by opting in first via a website or mobile interface (such as SMS, mobile Web, and Java/BREW applications).

The European Union also provides a legal framework for data protection that may be applied for location-based services, and more particularly several European directives such as: (1) Personal data: Directive 95/46/EC; (2) Personal data in electronic communications: Directive 2002/58/EC; (3) Data Retention: Directive 2006/24/EC. However the applicability of legal provisions to varying forms of LBS and of processing location data is unclear.

One implication of this technology is that data about a subscriber's location and historical movements is owned and controlled by the network operators, including mobile carriers and mobile content providers. Mobile content providers and app developers are a concern. Indeed, a recent MIT study  by de Montjoye et al. showed that 4 spatio-temporal points, approximate places and times, are enough to uniquely identify 95% of 1.5M people in a mobility database. The study further shows that these constraints hold even when the resolution of the dataset is low. Therefore, even coarse or blurred datasets provide little anonymity. A critical article by Dobson and Fisher discusses the possibilities for misuse of location information.

Beside the legal framework there exist several technical approaches to protect privacy using privacy-enhancing technologies (PETs). Such PETs range from simplistic on/off switches to sophisticated PETs using anonymization techniques (e.g. providing k-anonymity), or cryptograpic protocols. Only few LBS offer such PETs, e.g., Google Latitude offered an on/off switch and allows to stick one's position to a free definable location. Additionally, it is an open question how users perceive and trust in different PETs. The only study that addresses user perception of state of the art PETs is. Another set of techniques included in the PETs are the location obfuscation techniques, which slightly alter the location of the users in order to hide their real location while still being able to represent their position and receive services from their LBS provider.

See also

 Advanced Mobile Location
 At-location mapping
 Cartography
 Dashtop mobile
 Dead reckoning
 Enterprise digital assistant
 Fire Eagle
 Geo (marketing)
 Geoloqi
 GeoReader
 Geosocial networking
 Groundhog Technologies
 Key finder
 Indoor positioning system
 LocationSmart
 Location awareness
 Location as a service
 Location intelligence
 Location-based games
 Location-based media
 Mobile dating
 Mobile identity management
 Mobile local search
 Mobile positioning
 Navizon
 Near-me area network
 Real-time locating
 Reverse geocoding
 Social positioning method
 Urban informatics
 Wayfinding
 Wi-Fi positioning system

References

 

 
Geopositioning
Applications of geographic information systems